"Boom" is an R&B single by Mario. It was released as the fourth and final single from his second studio album, Turning Point, in 2005. The song features rapper Juvenile, who co-wrote the song with Lamarquis Jefferson, Johnta Austin, Craig Love and Lil Jon; the latter is also the producer. The song peaked on the US Billboard Rhythmic Top 40 chart at number 24.

Music video
The video premiered worldwide on TRL and was directed by Benny Boom.

Charts

References

2004 songs
2005 singles
J Records singles
Juvenile (rapper) songs
Mario (singer) songs
Music videos directed by Benny Boom
Song recordings produced by Lil Jon
Songs written by Craig Love
Songs written by Johntá Austin
Songs written by Juvenile (rapper)
Songs written by Lil Jon